Robert Cochrane Ross (9 September 1941 – 28 May 2022) was a Scottish professional footballer who played as a midfielder.

Early and personal life
Ross was from Edinburgh. He grew up in a working-class family of miners and expected to follow in their footsteps before discovering his talent for football. He moved to Lincolnshire for his career where he lived until his death.

Football career
Beginning his career in Scotland he played for Arniston Rangers, East Fife and St Mirren before a notable six-year spell with Grimsby Town. He finished his career with non-league side Gainsborough Trinity.

Death
Ross died at Diana Princess of Wales Hospital in Grimsby on 28 May 2022.

References

1941 births
2022 deaths
Scottish footballers
Footballers from Edinburgh
Association football midfielders
English Football League players
Arniston Rangers F.C. players
East Fife F.C. players
St Mirren F.C. players
Gainsborough Trinity F.C. players
Grimsby Town F.C. players